On the Turntable 2 is a second Mix album released by Biz Markie. It was the follow-up to 1998's On the Turntable.

Track listing
"Intro"  
"Watcha See Is Watcha Get"  
"Play The Blues For You"  
"Never Grow Old"  
"Food Stamps"  
"I Like It"  
"Do The Push & Pull"  
"Hip Hug Her" 
"Take You There"  
"No Name Bar"  
"I Wanna Sang"  
"Mr Big Stuff"  
"Holy Ghost"  
"Ike's Mood"  
"I'm Afraid the Masquerade's Over"  
"What a Man"  
"Do the Funky Penguin"
"Hung Up On My Baby"  
"Never Love a Man"  
"It's Time For Me To Love You"

Biz Markie albums
2000 compilation albums
Albums produced by Biz Markie
Sequel albums